Bruno Murari is an Italian inventor. During his career he has patented about 200 inventions in the field of circuit design, power technologies and MEMS (Micro Electro Mechanical Systems) devices. He is the only Italian to have received the Elmer A. Sperry Award., which is awarded to those who have distinguished themselves with proven engineering contributions to advance the field of transport. He was defined "legendary analog engineer" and "father" of the BCD technology

Early years
Murari grew up in Venice, on the island of San Giorgio and, after earning a diploma in electrical engineering, in 1955 at the Technical Institute "A. Pacinotti" in Mestre, he began working for Edison Volta, for which he designed substations and power lines in Val Camonica.

In 1961 he was hired at the Somiren (Nuclear Energy Radioactive Minerals Society) of San Donato Milanese, a small company of the Agip Nuclear group. After work, he attended evening classes at the Aurelio Beltrami Radiotechnical Institute and obtained an electronic expert's diploma two years later.

STMicroelectronics
In November 1961 Murari transferred to SGS (General semiconductor company) of Agrate Brianza, today STMicroelectronics, a startup founded by Adriano Olivetti and Virgilio Floriani, founder of Telettra, first at the Applications Laboratory and then in the linear integrated circuits design group. Thanks to the partnership with the semiconductor company Fairchild Semiconductor, he began collaborating with Bob Widlar, one of the pioneers of integrated circuit design.

At the end of the 1960s he developed the first audio amplifier integrated circuit for TVs and portable radios. Then he adapted the technology for integrated circuits, initially developed in the consumer electronics field, to the automotive market, obtaining the first voltage regulator with metal casing for automotive alternators, made with the STMicroelectronics bipolar process.

In 1972 he took on responsibility for the design of linear integrated circuits and in 1981 he became Director of the Research Laboratories of Cornaredo, whose mission was to develop technologies regarding high voltage integrated circuits.

Since 1998 Murari has begun the development of technologies and some MEMS devices (Micro Electro-Mechanical Systems), such as pressure transducers and multiaxial accelerometers, which have been used in video games, in smartphones and in numerous technological products.

Works

Achievements
In his career, Murari personally designed 10 integrated circuits, directed the development of over 2,000 integrated circuits and obtained more than 200 patents in the field of circuit design, power technologies and MEMS devices. He is considered the "father" of the BCD technology (Bipolar-CMOS-DMOS), which integrates bipolar technology for analog circuits, CMOS technology for control and digital logic and robust power components DMOS at high voltage. The resulting processes enabled the development of new applications in different areas, such as the automotive industry (and subsequent vehicle electrification; electronic engine control, replacement of mechanically controlled ignition systems with electronic modules), hard drives, starter for discharge lamps and high-powered car stereo systems.

Awards
 1993: finalist for the "EDN Innovator of the Year" award
 1995, Honorary degree, Ca' Foscari University of Venice
 1995: European SEMI Award
 2002, Honorary degree, Polytechnic University of Milan
 2011: Sapio Award for the industry
 2014: Lifetime Achievement Award from the MEMS and Sensors Industry Group
 2017: Elmer A. Sperry Award for being among the first to understand that silicon has not only extraordinary electrical properties but also unique physical and mechanical properties and for its contributions to the development of the first integrated circuit audio amplifiers for TVs and portable radios for SGS (General Semiconductor Company).

Personal life
Bruno Murari is married, with two children. He is passionate about free-flying model aircraft.

References

External links
 

Semiconductor device fabrication
Engineers from Venice
Italian computer scientists
Fellow Members of the IEEE
Analog electronics engineers
20th-century Italian inventors
1936 births
Living people